The Magnolia Petroleum Company was an early twentieth century petroleum company in Texas. The company was established in 1911, being later acquired by the Standard Oil of New York, which operated it as a wholly-owned subsidiary until its demise in 1959.

History 
The company was founded on April 24, 1911, by the Sealy family of Galveston, as a consolidation of several earlier companies, including J. S. Cullinan Company and its refinery in the East Texas Oil Field. Standard Oil of New York ("Socony") exchanged its stock for all of the Magnolia stock (except seven shares for the Directors) in December 1925 though it continued to operate as an affiliate of Socony. The firm then merged with Vacuum Oil Company in 1931, becoming "Socony-Vacuum Oil Company". 

Magnolia Petroleum continued to operate as a subsidiary of Socony-Vacuum. In 1959, Magnolia was fully incorporated into the Mobil division of Socony-Vacuum, which later changed its name to 'Socony Mobil' and, ultimately to Mobil Oil Corporation. In 1999, Mobil merged with Exxon to form ExxonMobil, one of the largest oil companies in the world. Preferred Magnolia stock was eventually converted to ExxonMobil stock, making the Sealy family (John Sealy Estate, Sealy Foundation) were some of the largest share holders of ExxonMobil. 

The acquisition proved to be one of the most important mergers that brought the majors in to develop the Corsican and Beaumont area in to one of the largest refineries in the world.

The emblem of Magnolia Petroleum Company was originally a magnolia blossom. When Socony merged with Vacuum in 1931, Socony-Vacuum as well as Magnolia began using Magnolia's Brand of ‘Red Flying Horse’ petroleum products a.k.a. red Pegasus logo, as well as the Mobil name for its products (Mobilgas, Mobiloil, etc.).

An unrelated Oklahoma-based company of the same name has been operating since 2008.

See also
 Magnolia Hotel (originally the "Magnolia Petroleum Building")
 Magnolia Service Station

References

Defunct oil companies of the United States
Petroleum in Texas
1910s in Texas
Energy companies established in 1911
Non-renewable resource companies established in 1911
Non-renewable resource companies disestablished in 1959
1911 establishments in Texas
1959 disestablishments in Texas
Defunct companies based in Texas
Former ExxonMobil subsidiaries
1925 mergers and acquisitions